Gujarat Science City is a science education and entertainment centre located in Ahmedabad, Gujarat, India. Opened in 2002 and expanded in 2021, it has an IMAX 3D theatre; exhibitions on science, space, energy park, life science park, planet earth, hall of science, musical fountain, thrill ride, plants, nature and robotics; an aquarium, an aviary and a butterfly park; as well as other facilities.

History 
In 1999, the Gujarat Council of Science City, an autonomous registered society was established under the Department of Science and Technology,  Government of Gujarat.

Under Phase-I of the development, the IMAX 3D theatre, the first in India, was opened in 2002. It was followed by constructions of various exhibitions such as Hall of Science, Hall of Space, Energy Education Park, Life Science Park, Planet Earth as well as facilities such as children's activity centre, thrill rides, amphitheatre and musical fountain.

They were inaugurated on 16 July 2021 by Prime Minister Narendra Modi.

Features

Entertainment facilities 
Entertainment facilities at the Science City include IMAX 3D theatre, 30-seat thrill ride, giant LED screen for displaying films, dancing musical fountains and 1200-seat capacity amphitheatre.

Planet Earth 

It has exhibits and rides about natural disasters, disaster management, planetarium, natural resources and its conservation. It has more than 650 exhibits.

Hall of Space and Science

The hall of space has an exhibition on solar system, universe, space technology and history of space exploration. The hall of science has exhibits on light, sound, mathematics, kinematics, vision, mirrors, energy and fluids.

Energy Education Park 
The park holds exhibits on solar energy, wind power, hydroelectricity, tidal power, geothermal energy, petroleum and petrochemicals. It has models of Sardar Sarovar dam and petroleum rigs.

Life Science Park 

The park spread over an area of 9000 sqm is dedicated to life sciences. It has exhibits on river system and evolution. It also has outdoor exhibition on aromatic, medicinal and economic plants as well as ornamental plants. There is a Cactus, Succulent and Bonsai Corner;  Butterfly House; aviary and tissue culture lab.

Aquatic gallery 

It has 68 tanks which hold brackish, marine and fresh waters in variety of ecosystems marked as Indian, Asian, African and American Zones. It has 11,690 animals from 188 species.

Robotics gallery 
The three floor robotics gallery has 79 types of robots on display. The ground floor has an interactive exhibition and a cafeteria. It also has an exhibit displaying evolution of robotics. There is a robot dance gallery, and virtual and augmented reality gallery as well.

Nature Park 

Activities 
Apart from science education and entertainment, the center also provides housing for students preparing for science exams.

Gallery

See also
 Science Centre, Surat
 Swami Vivekananda Planetarium, Mangalore

References

External links
 

Museums in Ahmedabad
Science museums in India
Education in Gujarat
Science and technology in Gujarat
Science parks in India
Tourist attractions in Ahmedabad
Planetaria in India